Otagho II Shervashidze (d. 1213) was a 12–13th century Georgian noble.

Biography 
Otagho Shervashidze was born during the second half of the 12th century to duke Otagho I and his unknown wife. During his youth, he was titled as a "duke of Tskhumi" and succeeded his father on the throne of Abkhazia. Nothing else is known about his reign except that he died in 1213. Following his death an interregnum began for a few years, until his son Dardin acquired the throne.

References

Sources 

Nobility of Georgia (country)
12th-century people from Georgia (country)
13th-century people from Georgia (country)
House of Shervashidze
1213 deaths